The Angry Video Game Nerd (abbreviated as AVGN) is an American retrogaming review comedy web series created by and starring James Rolfe. The series centers on Rolfe's titular skit character, often simply shortened to "the Nerd" (sometimes just "Nerd"), a fictionalized version of himself who is a short-tempered and foul-mouthed gamer who delivers commentary on retro games of poor quality. While the series began with Rolfe simply playing games while delivering retrospective commentary, the show would eventually grow in scope to encompass sketches featuring guest characters, reviews of gaming consoles and peripherals, and short lectures about video game history and culture.

Starting out as an independent filmmaker, Rolfe intended his earliest videos of the character (originally called The Angry Nintendo Nerd) to be a joke privately shown amongst friends and colleagues. In 2004, Rolfe, at the suggestion of future series producer Mike Matei, put the Angry Nintendo Nerd videos on his website, and in 2006 on the emerging video streaming platform YouTube, where it gained popularity. The series became a cult success, and Rolfe began appearing as the character in various other media such as a feature-length film and video games, and many public appearances. The series was soon renamed to The Angry Video Game Nerd to avoid trademark issues with Nintendo, and to allow Rolfe to review games from non-Nintendo consoles. From 2007 to 2011, the series entered a distribution deal with popular gaming websites ScrewAttack and GameTrailers, and briefly with streaming service Amazon Video in 2018.

The Angry Video Game Nerd is considered one of the pioneers of internet review videos, being highly influential on the style and format of subsequent video reviewers as well as being responsible for helping to bring the concept into the mainstream. Various media review/sketch comedy entertainers have since cited the show as inspiration for their own material, such as JonTron, Nostalgia Critic, Egoraptor, Angry Joe, and Joueur du Grenier among others.

Premise

The show revolves around the Nerd's commentary of shovelware and retro video games that he deems to be of particularly low quality, unfair difficulty, or poor design. Rolfe's character, "the Nerd", is a short-tempered, foul-mouthed video game collector who reviews old video games in the form reminiscent of insult comedies such as Mystery Science Theater 3000. The Nerd plays the game while picking apart its various technicalities, design flaws, and abnormalities in an effort to warn his viewers against playing the game. Other episodes have the Nerd reviewing consoles, peripherals, accessories, or games of a similar theme. The reviews are often prefaced with a short lecture about the games history or his own childhood experience, and interspersed with sketches and profanity-ridden comedic rants, among other various scripted elements. Occasionally episodes may often focus on games the Nerd looks at in high regard, but are still not immune from criticism such as EarthBound.

Dressed up as a stereotypical nerd in his basement, the Nerd reviews the game with his trademark eyeglasses and white collared shirt with a pocket full of pens, high khaki pants and white socks and loafers, while sometimes being bombarded by guest characters from video games and popular culture as well. These guests often provide additional commentary on the games, mock the Nerd's anguish, and act as parodies of the characters from which they had been derived. In response to them and to the games, the Nerd derives comic appeal from excessive and surrealistic use of fantasy scenarios, anger, and consumption of Rolling Rock (in addition to Yuengling in later videos) while reviewing video games. His anger and profanity over these bad games (usually punctuated by the catchphrase "What were they thinking?!", in reference to those who designed and/or marketed the game in question) would sometimes climax in him destroying whole game cartridges, or simulating defecating on, burning, and sometimes even crushing the games or entire video game consoles.

In many cases, the Nerd dresses up as other popular characters while reviewing their games, such as Batman and Indiana Jones. Other characters in the show include Shit Pickle (an earlier character created by Rolfe), the Guitar Guy (played by Kyle Justin, co-writer of the show's theme song), the Game Graphic Glitch Gremlin, Super Mecha Death Christ 2000 B.C. Version 4.0 Beta, and an assortment of others, while also the occasional guest appearance by other video game reviewers such as Pat the NES Punk. The show has also had special guests, including Lloyd Kaufman of Troma Entertainment while the Nerd was playing various Toxic Avengers-based games, Macaulay Culkin of Home Alone fame assisting the Nerd in playing games based on the movie series, and Gilbert Gottfried co-starring as a faux lead developer of Life of Black Tiger and the Nerd's arch-nemesis Fred "Fucks" (Fred Fuchs) in August 1, 2019, while the Nerd reviews said game.

Episodes

Production
James Rolfe's first two episodes were intended as "just a joke", with no intentions of making them public. In May 2004, he created his first on-camera game reviews, utilizing insult commentary with exaggerated bewilderment to two games—Castlevania II: Simon's Quest and Dr. Jekyll and Mr. Hyde—which would later become the signature of the Nerd character. At the time, the series was hastily titled Bad NES Games. Rolfe explained later in an interview for Daily News that the joke was just how upset one obsessive gamer could get over these games that were already 20 years old. Although the Dr. Jekyll and Mr. Hyde review was intended to be the last, Rolfe's friends, who enjoyed the previous "Bad NES Games" reviews, encouraged him to create another. Collaborative friend Mike Matei helped in producing and publishing the videos on Cinemassacre, and released outside of the website as "The Quickies" tape, part of a four VHS tape set called the "Cinemassacre Gold Collection".

In 2006, Rolfe began making the episodes available on YouTube. Soon, Rolfe released a review of The Karate Kid game that was the first episode where Rolfe's character is introduced as "The Angry Nintendo Nerd". Naming these videos "The Angry Nintendo Nerd Trilogy", Rolfe posted them on Cinemassacre. The success of the show made Rolfe branch out into other gaming systems, and would later change the title into the Angry Video Game Nerd to prevent trademark issues with Nintendo. Rolfe diversified the reviews of platforms and products such as the Atari 2600, Super NES, Sega Master System and Sega Genesis video game consoles, the Power Glove and U-Force peripherals, films such as The Wizard, and the Nintendo Power magazine. He would eventually branch out even further, reviewing games like Sonic '06 on the Xbox 360 and Big Rigs: Over the Road Racing on PC.

On September 12, 2006, Rolfe's series received mainstream attention when his review of Teenage Mutant Ninja Turtles went viral on YouTube. In an article by writer Alex Carlson, he explained that before 2004, video gaming criticism was mostly reserved for the larger game magazines and websites. He went on to state that the opinions of the professional writers and journalists who were writing the reviews didn't entirely correspond to the opinions of the average gamers; and that "everyone with a webcam and Fraps can now become a critic and don a characterized mentality, spouting profanities at will without getting censored." Since then, the show has increased substantially in quantity, production value, and fandom. Rolfe began infusing various episodes with emphasis on homemade special effects and narratives. The first of these cinematic episodes was a review of the 1989 Friday the 13th game in October 2006, featuring expressive lighting and camera angles to emphasize its horror film-themed narrative in which the Nerd is attacked by Jason Voorhees for disliking the game. Later episodes have alternated from straightforward game reviews to those with a narrative focus resembling a documentary, with Rolfe pointing out information about the game or gaming console under review. When asked if the Nerd is going to make reviews in the current generation of video games, Rolfe replied that the "show is all about nostalgia," adding that he's "mostly a retro gamer."

In late 2007, Rolfe halted the production of the series after suffering from a break in his voice. On March 17, 2010, he publicly announced that he was suffering from burnout as a result of stress from his constant work, and that the show would be entering a brief hiatus. The show was resumed a month later; however, only one episode was released each month, as opposed to two episodes per month due to Rolfe's other projects. In late 2011, Rolfe announced the show would be put out of production for a short while so he could work on the AVGN movie. The show eventually resumed production in late summer 2012. Since then, he has self-released Nerd videos on his Cinemassacre website and YouTube account in a very sporadic manner in order to balance his personal life with the other projects he continuously works on. By 2013, the show garnered more than 900,000 subscribers and over 400 million views on YouTube. By 2014, Cinemassacre already had 1.5 million subscribers. Rolfe stated that the show "got popular right around when YouTube got popular."

In January 2013, the YouTube channel was suddenly shut down due to claims of severe violations of YouTube's terms of service. YouTube later reinstated the channel.

In March 2016, the channel reached 2 million subscribers, 10 years after the channel's creation and first uploads. Rolfe made a short video to thank all the people who subscribed, watched the videos on the channel and for supporting himself, Mike Matei, and everyone who made Cinemassacre more popular. In June 2019, the channel reached 3 million subscribers, to which Rolfe once again thanked everyone's support and for the fans still watching Nerd videos on the show's 13th anniversary (on YouTube).

In December 2020, Rolfe announced on the main Cinemassacre YouTube channel that longtime collaborator Mike Matei would be leaving the channel in order for Matei to focus on his Twitch career.

In 2021, the channel is now backed up on Odysee, and the Cinemassacre's Monster Madness are available there, linked on their website.

Videography

VHS/DVD

Blu-ray

Other media
Rolfe's review of the Back to the Future game was reported in an MTV segment called "Viral Videos Infect the Mainstream". On November 2, 2008, his videos and personality were featured on the nationally syndicated radio show Opie and Anthony. The Nerd has also become the subject of Howard Stern and David Arquette in an episode of Stern's Sirius XM show, in which Stern commented negatively on the show's format as well as the gaming community in general during a TooManyGames 2011 convention in Philadelphia. James Rolfe himself appeared as the Nerd at various gaming and internet conventions.

On September 24, 2008, Rolfe collaborated with fellow internet reviewer (and good friend) Doug Walker to create a fictional feud between his character – Nostalgia Critic – and Rolfe's own. The plot behind the events created between the two was over the Critic's dislike towards comments made to one of his online videos that expressed similarities between him and the Nerd, supposedly written by the Nerd's fans, that were "unfair comparisons between the two of them". The pair worked together to create a series of tongue-in-cheek video responses between the two characters, culminating with a fight between the Critic and Nerd in Clifton, New Jersey, a dare between the pair to review something in the other's line of work (Nerd reviews a bad movie, Critic reviews a bad game), and a final fight between the pair in the Nerd's basement on October 10, 2008, which featured parodies and clichés from popular films such as The Matrix Reloaded and Star Wars: Episode III – Revenge of the Sith. The resulting series of videos created became a huge hit with fans. To celebrate the first anniversary of the ThatGuyWithTheGlasses website, both Walker and Rolfe collaborated again on a special video involving their characters, in which the plot focused on the pair meeting once more to battle against the other, in which they were joined by fellow reviewers and contributors to the website who sided with one or the other, culminating with the pair calling a truce and putting their differences aside. Rolfe would later guest star as his character in various Channel Awesome shows, even appearing to review the Teenage Mutant Ninja Turtle movie with the Nostalgia Critic, with both the Nerd and Critic making a background cameo appearance in the anime Zettai Karen Children: The Unlimited.

Film

On July 21, 2014, an independent film based on the series, entitled Angry Video Game Nerd: The Movie, was released online as well as limited theatrical releases, with DVD and Blu-ray versions released by the end of the year. The film's plot focuses around the Nerd seeking to prove that over 1 million copies of the proclaimed "worst video game of all time", E.T. the Extra-Terrestrial for the Atari 2600, were not buried, after being pressured by fans to review the video game. In his quest to prove this to his fans, the Nerd finds himself being pursued by federal authorities who believe he is investigating Area 51 and the crash of an unidentified flying object.

The film began development in late 2006, following the popularity of the Angry Video Game Nerd web series, with James Rolfe serving as its director, producer, and co-writer, and reprising his on-screen role as The Nerd. The movie's script was designed to pay homage to the character finally reviewing the E.T. video game, though filming required Rolfe to balance his schedule with that of his online series and other works. The screenplay was completed by 2008, with the film's budget of more than  raised entirely from crowdfunding. As part of its development, Rolfe asked for the show's fanbase to provide webcam footage of themselves fictionally reacting to the Nerd's webseries, to be used as an intro to the film.

Although Rolfe has not ruled out the possibility of a sequel to the film, which would have involved the lost Swordquest treasures, he regards it as highly unlikely due to the amount of time spent developing and filming the Angry Video Game Nerd: The Movie and his focus on other film projects.

Video games

In 2013, an official video game titled Angry Video Game Nerd Adventures was announced. Developed by FreakZone Games (creators of Manos: The Hands of Fate), it was released on September 20, 2013, on Microsoft Windows via Steam. The game follows the Nerd attempting to rescue his friends, all of whom were sucked into the Nerd's television set (done in a Cheetahmen-esque style). The Nerd uses a NES Zapper as his main weapon, and a character known as Naggi the Patronizing Firefly, a parody of Navi from The Legend of Zelda: Ocarina of Time, guides him through the tutorial. Throughout the game, he faces zombies, Mr. Hyde, Custer, The Giant Claw, Fred "Fucks" (Fred Fuchs), parodies of Jason Voorhees and Freddy Krueger (references to the A Nightmare on Elm Street and Friday the 13th games respectively) named Bimmy and Jimmy (a reference to the infamous Double Dragon III misspelling of Billy Lee's name as "Bimmy"), and more. On July 12, 2014, it was announced that the game would also be released on Wii U and Nintendo 3DS. The Wii U version was released in North America on April 2, 2015, and released in Europe on December 10, 2015. On June 4, 2015, a 3DS version became available for download in the Nintendo eShop. On July 17 of the same year, during ScrewAttack's annual SGC convention, Freakzone announced a sequel, Angry Video Game Nerd II: ASSimilation, originally due for release in Winter 2015, but delayed to March 29, 2016.

A remastered version of the first two games, The Angry Video Game Nerd I & II Deluxe, was announced in 2019 and released on October 30, 2020, for Nintendo Switch and Steam, with ports for PlayStation 4 and Xbox One following on March 19, 2021 and on Epic Games Store on December 20, 2021. The remaster, also developed by FreakZone Games in close collaboration with the Cinemassacre team, features new difficulty options, altered story elements (characters and events from the films have been replaced), tweaked level designs, various improvements and an additional story chapter unlocked after completing both games.

There have also been some unofficial, fanmade Angry Video Game Nerd games including Angry Video Game Nerd's Angry Video Game, Angry Video Game Nerd in Pixel Land Blast, AVGN Game Over, AVGN Game Over 2, and AVGN Planet. There is also the Angry Video Game Nerd and AVGN K.O. Boxing, both for the Atari 2600. The Nerd touched upon these games in the episode AVGN Games. The Nerd also appeared as a playable character in the game Texting of the Bread produced by ScrewAttack.

Music

The opening song of the show, simply entitled The Angry Video Game Nerd Theme Song, is a staple of the series since its earliest conception. The song was written by Kyle Justin and James Rolfe, and performed by Justin. Over the years, the song had different variations to correspond with specials. Programmer and musician Lachlan Barclay published a soundtrack album based on the web-series in 2011. This earliest compilation of the show was created by Barclay due to demands from fans after he played the song on Video XYZ. Another compilation album was released in 2013 containing the music derived from the Nerd's video game. Developed also by FreakZone, the album was released by ScrewAttack Entertainment LLC as a digital download. An album based from the movie was released in 2014 composed by Bear McCreary, who had previously worked with Rolfe on the webseries Christmas special. The film's music was composed of rock-and-roll, heavy metal, a symphonic orchestra, and synthesized musical elements from various gaming systems such as NES, SNES, and SEGA Genesis. The album features two remixes by McCreary as well.

Reception and legacy
The Angry Video Game Nerd show made James Rolfe one of the most popular Internet celebrities before the advent of YouTube. The Angry Video Game Nerd was voted Best Online Web Series in Mashable's 3rd Annual Open Web Awards on December 16, 2009. Peggy Rajski describes the origin of the show's success stemming from the correct use of the internet as well as the crowd funding system. Rajski further said that "[Rolfe] already cultivated an audience that cared about his prior work. When he asked them to step up, clearly they were willing to." Fellow filmmaker and internet celebrity Doug Walker dubbed the Nerd the "Greatest Video Game Critic of All Time". Jacob Rich of Michigan Daily described the Nerd as the "pioneering internet 'gamer' show", adding that "pretty much every major game review show online today has 'AVGN' to thank for establishing its format". The French show Joueur du Grenier was based on Angry Video Game Nerd.

Zach Whalen described the show's presentation of retro gaming into contemporary gamers as "a process of looking back to an unattainable past and trying to bring that past into the present". Rolfe also commented during an interview with The Guardian of the show's impact in the current generation of the video game industry, saying that they "still relate to it and they like learning of the past". In the same article, reporter Luke Langlands also noted the show's influence of inspiring the creation of other independent online shows. The Nerd's success as an independent celebrity outside of the commercial mainstream of pop culture, popularized the notion of making lifelong careers online. In a survey published by Mediscape, a number of people admitted to being inspired by the Nerd to create and submit their own content in various online spaces, including YouTube, DeviantArt, SourceForge, GameFAQs and ScrewAttack, influencing the likes of those such as the Nostalgia Critic, Angry Joe and others.

In his analysis of the show and the character, writer Alex Carlson of Hardcore Gamer dubbed Rolfe's character "The Nerd Who Changed Gaming Culture Forever". In his written article, he described the Angry Video Game Nerd as "one of the most recognizable figures in gaming culture", adding that "if you're a gamer, it's nearly guaranteed that you've browsed YouTube and seen at least a couple of videos from the series. Nearly a decade after the series' humble inception, James Rolfe's frequently sailor-mouthed alter-ego is still spreading influence. With each new gaming channel appearing on YouTube, there's some level of inspiration coming straight from The Nerd. From the very beginning, The Angry Video Game Nerd was a giant leap forward. Whether James Rolfe knew it or not, the rise of The Nerd was a moment that changed gaming critique and entertainment forever".

References

External links

 
 
 
 

2000s YouTube series
2004 establishments in the United States
2004 web series debuts
2010s YouTube series
2020s YouTube series
American comedy web series
American YouTubers
Black comedy

Comedy YouTubers
YouTube critics and reviewers
Internet memes
Internet memes introduced in 2006
Mass media companies established in 2004
RPM channels
Television series by Otter Media
Video game critics
Video game news websites
Viral videos
YouTube channels launched in 2006